Walon Sport, or simply Walon, is a multinational textile business founded in 1989 in Peru. It is one of the principal sportswear manufacturers in Peru, and it provides the kits for various association football clubs in the Liga 1 (Peruvian first division). The company further expanded its production when it acquired deals with clubs in the Colombian Categoría Primera A.

Walon Sport has also been the sponsor of the Peru national football team from 1998 to 2010.

Sponsorships

Football teams

Clubs

 Universitario de Sucre  (since 2015 season)

 Deportes Quindío
 Patriotas F.C.  (since 2013 season)

Atlético Pantoja
Moca FC

 Cusco
 León de Huánuco
 Universidad César Vallejo

 Alianza Atletico
 Atlético Grau
 Atlético Minero
 Melgar
 Colegio Nacional de Iquitos
 Los Caimanes
 Total Chalaco

 Amauta

National teams

Volleyball

External links 

Clothing companies of Peru
Companies based in Lima
Companies established in 1989
Peruvian brands
Sportswear brands